Spaniards, or Spanish people, are a Romance ethnic group native to Spain. Within Spain, there are a number of national and regional ethnic identities that reflect the country's complex history,  including a number of different languages, both indigenous and local linguistic descendants of the Roman-imposed Latin language, of which Spanish is the largest and the only one that is official throughout the whole country.

Commonly spoken regional languages include, most notably, the sole surviving indigenous language of Iberia, Basque, as well as other Latin-descended Romance languages like Spanish itself, Catalan and Galician. Many populations outside Spain have ancestors who emigrated from Spain and share elements of a Hispanic culture. The most notable of these comprise Hispanic America in the Western Hemisphere.

The Roman Republic conquered Iberia during the 2nd and 1st centuries BC. Hispania, the name given to Iberia by the Romans as a province of their Empire, became highly acculturated through a process of linguistic and cultural Romanization, and as such, the majority of local languages in Spain today, with the exception of Basque, evolved out of Vulgar Latin which was introduced by Roman soldiers. The Romans laid the foundations for modern Spanish culture and identity, and Spain was the birthplace of important Roman emperors such as Trajan, Hadrian or Theodosius I.

At the end of the Western Roman Empire, the Germanic tribal confederations migrated from Central Europe, invaded the Iberian peninsula and established relatively independent realms in its western provinces, including the Suebi, Alans and Vandals. Eventually, the Visigoths would forcibly integrate all remaining independent territories in the peninsula, including the Byzantine province of Spania, into the Visigothic Kingdom, which more or less unified politically, ecclesiastically, and legally all the former Roman provinces or successor kingdoms of what was then documented as Hispania.

In the early eighth century, the Visigothic Kingdom was conquered by the Umayyad Islamic Caliphate, that arrived to the peninsula in the year 711. The Muslim rule in the Iberian Peninsula (al-Andalus) soon became autonomous from Baghdad. The handful of small Christian pockets in the north left out of Muslim rule, along the presence of the Carolingian Empire near the Pyrenean range, would eventually lead to the emergence of the Christian kingdoms of León, Castile, Aragon, Portugal and Navarre. Along seven centuries, an intermittent southwards expansion of the latter kingdoms (metahistorically dubbed as a reconquest: the Reconquista) took place, culminating with the Christian seizure of the last Muslim polity (the Nasrid Kingdom of Granada) in 1492, the same year Christopher Columbus arrived in the New World. During the centuries after the Reconquista, the Christian kings of Spain persecuted and expelled ethnic and religious minorities such as Jews and Muslims through the Spanish Inquisition.

A process of political conglomeration among the Christian kingdoms also ensued, and the late 15th-century saw the dynastic union of Castile and Aragon under the Catholic Monarchs, sometimes considered as the point of emergence of Spain as a unified country. The Conquest of Navarre occurred in 1512. There was also a period called Iberian Union, the dynastic union of the Kingdom of Portugal and the Spanish Crown; during which, both countries were ruled by the Spanish Habsburg kings between 1580 and 1640.

In the early modern period, Spain had one of the largest empires in history, which was also one of the first global empires, leaving a large cultural and linguistic legacy that includes over 570 million Hispanophones, making Spanish the world's second-most spoken native language, after Mandarin Chinese. During the Golden Age there were also many advancements in the arts, with the rise of renowned painters such as Diego Velázquez. The most famous Spanish literary work, Don Quixote, was also published during the Golden Age.

The population of Spain has become more diverse due to immigration of the late 20th and early 21st centuries. From 2000 to 2010, Spain had among the highest per capita immigration rates in the world and the second-highest absolute net migration in the world (after the United States). The diverse regional and cultural populations mainly include the Castilians, Catalans, Andalusians, Valencians, Balearics, Canarians, Basques and the Galicians among others.

Historical background

Early populations

The earliest modern humans inhabiting the region of Spain are believed to have been Neolithic peoples, who may have arrived in the Iberian Peninsula as early as 35,000–40,000 years ago. The Iberians are believed to have arrived or emerged in the region as a culture between the 4th millennium BC and the 3rd millennium BC, settling initially along the Mediterranean coast.

Then Celts settled in Spain during the Iron Age. Some of those tribes in North-central Spain, who had cultural contact with the Iberians, are called Celtiberians. In addition, a group known as the Tartessians and later Turdetanians inhabited southwestern Spain. They are believed to have developed a separate culture influenced by Phoenicia. The seafaring Phoenicians, Greeks, and Carthaginians successively settled trading colonies along the Mediterranean coast over a period of several centuries. Interaction took place with Indigenous peoples. The Second Punic War between the Carthaginians and Romans was fought mainly in what is now Spain and Portugal.

The Roman Republic conquered Iberia during the 2nd and 1st centuries BC, and established a series of Latin-speaking provinces in the region. As a result of Roman colonization, the majority of local languages, with the exception of Basque, stem from the Vulgar Latin that was spoken in Hispania (Roman Iberia). A new group of Romance languages of the Iberian Peninsula including Spanish, which eventually became the main language in Spain evolved from Roman expansion. Hispania emerged as an important part of the Roman Empire and produced notable historical figures such as Trajan, Hadrian, Seneca and Quintilian.

The Germanic Vandals and Suebi, with Iranian Alans under King Respendial, arrived in the peninsula in 409 AD. Part of the Vandals with the remaining Alans, now under Geiseric, removed to North Africa after a few conflicts with another Germanic tribe, the Visigoths. The latter were established in Toulouse and supported Roman campaigns against the Vandals and Alans in 415–19 AD.

The Visigoths became the dominant power in Iberia and reigned for three centuries. They were highly romanized in the eastern Empire and already Christians, so they became fully integrated into the late Iberian-Roman culture.

The Suebi were another Germanic tribe in the west of the peninsula; some sources said that they became established as federates of the Roman Empire in the old Northwestern Roman province of Gallaecia (roughly, present-day northern Portugal and Galicia). But they were largely independent and raided neighboring provinces to expand their political control over ever-larger portions of the southwest after the Vandals and Alans left. They created a totally independent Suebic Kingdom. In 447 AC they converted to Roman Catholicism under King Rechila.

After being checked and reduced in 456 AD by the Visigoths, the Suebic Kingdom survived to 585 AD. It was decimated as an independent political unit by the Visigoths, after having been involved in the internal affairs of their kingdom.

Middle Ages
After two centuries of domination by the Visigothic Kingdom, the Iberian Peninsula was invaded by a Muslim force under Tariq Bin Ziyad in 711. This army consisted mainly of ethnic Berbers from the Ghomara tribe, who were reinforced by Arabs from Syria once the conquest was complete. Only a remote mountainous area in the far north retained independence, eventually developing as the Christian Kingdom of Asturias.

Muslim Iberia became part of the Umayyad Caliphate and would be known as Al-Andalus. The Berbers of Al Andalus revolted as early as 740 AD, halting Arab expansion across the Pyrenee Mountains into France. Upon the collapse of the Umayyad in Damascus, Spain was seized by Yusuf al Fihri. The exiled Umayyad Prince Abd al-Rahman I next seized power, establishing himself as Emir of Cordoba. Abd al Rahman III, his grandson, proclaimed a Caliphate in 929, marking the beginning of the Golden Age of Al Andalus. This policy was the effective power of the peninsula and Western North Africa; it competed with the Shiite rulers of Tunis and frequently raided the small Christian kingdoms in the North.

The Caliphate of Córdoba effectively collapsed during a ruinous civil war between 1009 and 1013; it was not finally abolished until 1031, when al-Andalus broke up into a number of mostly independent mini-states and principalities called taifas. These were generally too weak to defend themselves against repeated raids and demands for tribute from the Christian states to the north and west, which were known to the Muslims as "the Galician nations". These had expanded from their initial strongholds in Galicia, Asturias, Cantabria, the Basque country, and the Carolingian Marca Hispanica to become the Kingdoms of Navarre, León, Portugal, Castile and Aragon, and the County of Barcelona. Eventually they began to conquer territory, and the Taifa kings asked for help from the Almoravids, Muslim Berber rulers of the Maghreb. But the Almoravids went on to conquer and annex all the Taifa kingdoms.

In 1086 the Almoravid ruler of Morocco, Yusuf ibn Tashfin, was invited by the Muslim princes in Iberia to defend them against Alfonso VI, King of Castile and León. In that year, Tashfin crossed the straits to Algeciras and inflicted defeat on the Christian army at the Battle of Sagrajas. By 1094, Yusuf ibn Tashfin had removed all Muslim princes in Iberia and had annexed their states, except for the one at Zaragoza. He also regained Valencia from the Christians. About this time a massive process of conversion to Islam took place, and Muslims comprised the majority of the population in Spain by the end of the 11th century.

The Almoravids were succeeded by the Almohads, another Berber dynasty, after the victory of Abu Yusuf Ya'qub al-Mansur over the Castilian Alfonso VIII at the Battle of Alarcos in 1195. In 1212 a coalition of Christian kings under the leadership of the Castilian Alfonso VIII defeated the Almohads at the Battle of Las Navas de Tolosa. But the Almohads continued to rule Al-Andalus for another decade, though with much reduced power and prestige. The civil wars following the death of Abu Ya'qub Yusuf II rapidly led to the re-establishment of taifas. The taifas, newly independent but weakened, were quickly conquered by the kingdoms of Portugal, Castile, and Aragon. After the fall of Murcia (1243) and the Algarve (1249), only the Emirate of Granada survived as a Muslim state, tributary of Castile until 1492.

In 1469 the marriage of Ferdinand of Aragon and Isabella of Castile signaled a joining of forces to attack and conquer the Emirate of Granada. The King and Queen convinced the Pope to declare their war a crusade. The Christians were successful and finally, in January 1492, after a long siege, the Moorish sultan Muhammad XII surrendered the fortress palace, the renowned Alhambra.

Spain conquered the Canary Islands between 1402 and 1496. Their indigenous Berber population, the Guanches, were gradually absorbed by intermarrying with Spanish settlers.

Spanish conquest of the Iberian part of Navarre was begun by Ferdinand II of Aragon and completed by Charles V. The series of military campaigns extended from 1512 to 1524, while the war lasted until 1528 in the Navarre to the north of the Pyrenees. Between 1568 and 1571, Charles V armies fought and defeated a general insurrection of the Muslims of the mountains of Granada. Charles V then ordered the expulsion of up to 80,000 Granadans from the province and their dispersal throughout Spain.

The union of the Christian kingdoms of Castile and Aragon as well as the conquest of Granada, Navarre and the Canary Islands led to the formation of the Spanish state as known today. This allowed for the development of a Spanish identity based on the Spanish language and a local form of Catholicism. This gradually developed in a territory that remained culturally, linguistically and religiously very diverse.

A majority of Jews were forcibly converted to Catholicism during the 14th and 15th centuries and those remaining were expelled from Spain in 1492. The open practice of Islam by Spain's sizeable Mudejar population was similarly outlawed. Furthermore, between 1609 and 1614, a significant number of Moriscos— (Muslims who had been baptized Catholic) were expelled by royal decree. Although initial estimates of the number of Moriscos expelled such as those of Henri Lapeyre reach 300,000 moriscos (or 4% of the total Spanish population), the extent and severity of the expulsion has been increasingly challenged by modern historians. Nevertheless, the eastern region of Valencia, where ethnic tensions were highest, was particularly affected by the expulsion, suffering economic collapse and depopulation of much of its territory.

The Islamic legacy in Spain has been long lasting, and among many others, accounts for two of the eight masterpieces of Islamic architecture from around the world: the Alhambra of Granada and the Cordoba Mosque; the Palmeral of Elche   is listed as a World Heritage Site due to its uniqueness.

Those who avoided expulsion or who managed to return to Spain merged into the dominant culture. The last mass prosecution against Moriscos for crypto-Islamic practices took place in Granada in 1727, with most of those convicted receiving relatively light sentences. By the end of the 18th century, Indigenous Islam and Morisco identity were considered to have been extinguished in Spain.

Colonialism and emigration

In the 16th century, following the military conquest of most of the new continent, perhaps 240,000 Spaniards entered American ports. They were joined by 450,000 in the next century. It is estimated that during the colonial period (1492–1832), a total of 1.86 million Spaniards settled in the Americas and a further 3.5 million immigrated during the post-colonial era (1850–1950); the estimate is 250,000 in the 16th century, and most during the 18th century as immigration was encouraged by the new Bourbon Dynasty. After the conquest of Mexico and Peru these two regions became the principal destinations of Spanish colonial settlers in the 16th century. In the period 1850–1950, 3.5 million Spanish left for the Americas, particularly Argentina, Uruguay, Mexico, Brazil, Chile, Venezuela, and Cuba. From 1840 to 1890, as many as 40,000 Canary Islanders emigrated to Venezuela. 94,000 Spaniards chose to go to Algeria in the last years of the 19th century, and 250,000 Spaniards lived in Morocco at the beginning of the 20th century.

By the end of the Spanish Civil War, some 500,000 Spanish Republican refugees had crossed
the border into France. From 1961 to 1974, at the height of the guest worker in Western Europe, about 100,000 Spaniards emigrated each year. The nation has formally apologized to expelled Jews and since 2015 offers the chance for people to reclaim Spanish citizenship. By 2019, over 132,000 Sephardic Jewish descendants had reclaimed Spanish citizenship.

The population of Spain has become more diverse due to immigration of the late 20th and early 21st centuries. From 2000 to 2010, Spain had among the highest per capita immigration rates in the world and the second-highest absolute net migration in the world (after the United States). Immigrants now make up about 10% of the population. But Spain's prolonged economic crisis between 2008 and 2015 reduced economic opportunities, and both immigration rates and the total number of foreigners in the country declined. By the end of this period, Spain was becoming a net emigrant country.

Ancestry

Historical origins and genetics

The Spanish people's genetic pool largely derives from the pre-Roman inhabitants of the Iberian Peninsula:

Pre-Indo-European and Indo-European speaking pre-Celtic groups: (Iberians, Vettones, Turdetani, Aquitani).

Celts (Gallaecians, Celtiberians, Turduli and Celtici), who were Romanized after the conquest of the region by the ancient Romans. 

There are also some genetic influences from Germanic tribes who arrived after the Roman period, including the Suebi, Hasdingi Vandals, Alans and Visigoths. Due to its position on the Mediterranean Sea, like other Southern European countries, the land that is now Spain also had contact with other Mediterranean peoples such as the ancient Phoenicians, Greeks and Carthaginians who briefly settled along the Iberian Mediterranean coast, the Sephardi Jewish community, and Berbers and Arabs arrived during Al-Andalus, all of them leaving some North African and Middle Eastern genetic contributions, particularly in the Southern and Western Iberian Peninsula.

Peoples of Spain

Nationalities and regions

Within Spain, there are various nationalities and regional populations including the Andalusians, Castilians, Catalans, Valencians and Balearics (who speak Catalan, a distinct Romance language in eastern Spain), the Basques (who live in the Basque country and north of Navarre and speak Basque, a non-Indo-European language), and the Galicians (who speak Galician, a descendant of old Galician-Portuguese).

Respect to the existing cultural pluralism is important to many Spaniards. In many regions there exist strong regional identities such as Asturias, Aragon, the Canary Islands, León, and Andalusia, while in others (like Catalonia, Basque Country or Galicia) there are stronger national sentiments. Many of them refuse to identify themselves with the Spanish ethnic group and prefer some of the following:

Nationalities and regional identities

Romani minority

Spain is home to one of the largest communities of Romani people (commonly known by the English exonym "gypsies", Spanish: gitanos). The Spanish Roma, which belong to the Iberian Kale subgroup (calé), are a formerly-nomadic community, which spread across Western Asia, North Africa, and Europe, first reaching Spain in the 15th century.

Data on ethnicity is not collected in Spain, although the Government's statistical agency CIS estimated in 2007 that the number of Gitanos present in Spain is probably around one million. Most Spanish Roma live in the autonomous community of Andalusia, where they have traditionally enjoyed a higher degree of integration than in the rest of the country. A number of Spanish Calé also live in Southern France, especially in the region of Perpignan.

Modern immigration

The population of Spain has become increasingly diverse due to recent immigration. From 2000 to 2010, Spain had among the highest per capita immigration rates in the world and the second highest absolute net migration in the World (after the United States) and immigrants now make up about 10% of the population. Since 2000, Spain has absorbed more than 3 million immigrants, with thousands more arriving each year. In 2008, the immigrant population topped over 4.5 million. These immigrants came mainly from Europe, Latin America, Asia, North Africa, and West Africa.

Languages

Languages spoken in Spain include Spanish (castellano or español) (74%), Catalan (català, called valencià, in the Valencian Community) (17%), Galician (galego) (7%), and Basque (euskara) (2%). Other languages with a lower level of official recognition are Asturian (asturianu), Aranese Gascon (aranés), Aragonese (aragonés), and Leonese, each with their own various dialects. Spanish is the official state language, although the other languages are co-official in a number of autonomous communities.

Peninsular Spanish is typically classified in northern and southern dialects; among the southern ones Andalusian Spanish is particularly important. The Canary Islands have a distinct dialect of Spanish which is close to Caribbean Spanish. The Spanish language is a Romance language and is one of the aspects (including laws and general "ways of life") that causes Spaniards to be labelled a Latin people. Spanish has a significant Arabic influence in vocabulary; between the 8th and 12th centuries, Arabic was the dominant language in Al-Andalus and some 4,000 words are of Arabic origin, including nouns, verbs and adjectives. It also has influences from other Romance languages such as French, Italian, Catalan, Galician or Portuguese. Traditionally, the Basque language has been considered a key influence on Spanish, though nowadays this is questioned. Other changes are borrowings from English and other Germanic languages, although English influence is stronger in Latin America than in Spain.

The number of speakers of Spanish as a mother tongue is roughly 35.6 million, while the vast majority of other groups in Spain such as the Galicians, Catalans, and Basques also speak Spanish as a first or second language, which boosts the number of Spanish speakers to the overwhelming majority of Spain's population of 46 million.

Spanish was exported to the Americas due to over three centuries of Spanish colonial rule starting with the arrival of Christopher Columbus to Santo Domingo in 1492. Spanish is spoken natively by over 400 million people and spans across most countries of the Americas; from the Southwestern United States in North America down to Tierra del Fuego, the southernmost region of South America in Chile and Argentina. A variety of the language, known as Judaeo-Spanish or Ladino (or Haketia in Morocco), is still spoken by descendants of Sephardim (Spanish and Portuguese Jews) who fled Spain following a decree of expulsion of practising Jews in 1492. Also, a Spanish creole language known as Chabacano, which developed by the mixing of Spanish and native Tagalog and Cebuano languages during Spain's rule of the country through Mexico from 1565 to 1898, is spoken in the Philippines (by roughly 1 million people).

Religion

Roman Catholicism is by far the largest denomination present in Spain, although its share of the population has been decreasing for decades. According to a study by the Spanish Centre for Sociological Research in 2013 about 71% of Spaniards self-identified as Catholics, 2% other faith, and about 25% identified as atheists or declared they had no religion. Survey data for 2019 show Catholics down to 69%, 2.8% "other faith" and 27% atheist-agnostic-non-believers.

Emigration from Spain

Outside of Europe, Latin America has the largest population of people with ancestors from Spain. These include people of full or partial Spanish ancestry.

People with Spanish ancestry

The listings above shows the nine countries with known collected data on people with ancestors from Spain, although the definitions of each of these are somewhat different and the numbers cannot really be compared. Spanish Chilean of Chile and Spanish Uruguayan of Uruguay could be included by percentage (each at above 40%) instead of numeral size.

See also

 Demographics of Spain
 Hispanosphere
 Genetic history of the Iberian Peninsula
 Nationalisms and regionalisms of Spain
 Nationalities and regions of Spain
 Spanish nationalities and regional identities
 Andalusian people
 Aragonese people
 Asturian people
 Balearic people
 Basque people
 Cagot
 Canarian people
 Cantabrian people
 Castilian people
 Catalan people
 Extremaduran people
 Galician people
 Leonese people
 Valencian people
 Vaqueiros de alzada
 Languages of Spain
 Spanish (see also dialects and varieties)
 Catalan/Valencian
 Basque
 Galician
 Aranese
 Aragonese
 Asturian
 Judaeo-Spanish
 Leonese
 Murcian language
 Ancient peoples of Spain
 Pre-Roman peoples of the Iberian Peninsula
 Iberians
 Celtiberians
 Gallaeci, Lusitanians, Cantabrians, Vascones
 Greeks and Punics (Phoenicians and Carthaginians)
 Guanches (in the Canary Islands)
 Romans
 Suebi
 Vandals
 Visigoths
 Moors of the Al-Andalus (Arabs/Berbers)
 History of the Jews in Spain
 Peoples with Spanish ancestry
 Criollos (Spaniards in the former Spanish Empire)
 Afro-Spaniards
 Emancipados
 Fernandinos
 Latin Americans
 Latino Americans
 Isleños
 Louisiana Creole people
 Spanish Americans
 Spanish Argentinians
 Spanish Australians
 Spanish Brazilians
 Spanish Britons
 Spanish Canadians
 Spanish Central Americans
 Spanish Chileans
 Spanish Equatoguineans
 Spanish Filipino
 Spanish Mexican
 Spanish Peruvians
 Spanish Puerto Ricans
 Spanish Uruguayans
 Spanish Colombians
 White Latin Americans

Notes

References

Sources
 Castro, Americo. Willard F. King and Selma Margaretten, trans. The Spaniards: An Introduction to Their History. Berkeley, California: University of California Press, 1980. .
 Chapman, Robert. Emerging Complexity: The Later Pre-History of South-East Spain, Iberia, and the West Mediterranean. Cambridge: Cambridge University Press, 1990. .
 Goodwin, Godfrey. Islamic Spain. San Francisco: Chronicle Books, 1990. .
 Harrison, Richard. Spain at the Dawn of History: Iberians, Phoenicians, and Greeks. New York: Thames & Hudson, 1988. .
 James, Edward (ed.). Visigothic Spain: New Approaches. Oxford: Clarendon Press, 1980. .
 Thomas, Hugh. The Slave Trade: The History of the Atlantic Slave Trade 1440–1870. London: Picador, 1997. .
 The genomic history of the Iberian Peninsula over the past 8000 years (Science, 15 March 2019, Vol. 363, Issue 6432, pp. 1230-1234)

Ethnic groups in Spain
 
Romance peoples